Samyung ENC is a South Korean manufacturer of marine communication and navigation systems. The company is publicly listed and traded on the KOSDAQ.

Market share
Samyung ENC is a leading company in a highly fragmented marine electronics industry that includes Raymarine, Humminbird, Lowrance, Simrad, B&G, Magellan, Murphy, Naviop, Northstar, Samyung ENC, Sitex, TwoNav, Furuno, Geonav.

Products
The product line includes high frequency radio, GPS floater, and very high frequency (VHF) transmitter-receiver.

References

Manufacturing companies established in 1978
Engineering companies of South Korea
Manufacturing companies based in Busan
Navigation system companies
Marine electronics
South Korean brands
South Korean companies established in 1978
Companies listed on the Korea Exchange